The Costello Case is a 1930 American pre-Code crime film directed by Walter Lang.

Cast
 Tom Moore as Mahoney
 Lola Lane as Mollie
 Roscoe Karns as Blair
 Wheeler Oakman as Mile-Away-Harry
 Russell Hardie as Jimmie
 William B. Davidson as Saunders (as William Davidson)
 Dorothy Vernon as Landlady
 Jack Richardson as Donnelly
 W. E. Lawrence as Babe
 Millard K. Wilson as Henderson (as M.K. Wilson)

References

External links
 

1930 films
1930 crime films
American crime films
1930s English-language films
American black-and-white films
Films directed by Walter Lang
1930s American films